Annette Lucile Noble ( – ) was an American novelist and travel writer.  

She was the daughter of Dr. William Noble, a physician, and Amelia Stiles Denio, a descendant of Ezra Stiles. She was educated at Phipps Union Seminary in Albion. Noble was a prolific author, and her most popular work was the novel Uncle Jack’s Executors (1880). She was a frequent traveler and was said to have crossed the Atlantic Ocean forty times.

Annette Lucile Noble died on 27 November 1932 in Albion.

Bibliography 

 Eleanor Willoughby (1870)
 St. Augustine's Ladder (1872)
 Judge Branard's Infantry (1873)
 Under Shelter (1876)
 Out of the Way (1877)
 Queer Home in Rugby Court (1878)
 Silas Gower's Daughters (1878)
 Uncle Jack’s Executors (1880)
 Eunice Lathrop, Spinster (1881)
 Tarryport Schoolhouse (1882)
 How Billy Went Up in the World (1883)
 Miss Janet's Old House (1884)
 The Professor's Girls (1885)
 Dave Marquand (1886)
 After the Failure (1887)
 The Professor's Dilemma (1888)
 The Silent Man’s Legacy (1888)
 Rachel’s Farm (1894)
 Love and Shawl-straps (1895)
 Jesse: A Story in the Time of Christ (1898)
 The Crazy Angel (1901)
 Under Twelve Flags (1903)
 Easie's Miracle
 In a Country Town 
 Jacob's Heiress
 Miss Robert's Lodgers in a Little Welsh Town
 The Parsonage Secret
 Ryhoves of Antwerp
 Summerwild
 The Tarryport School Girls
 Eugene's Quest
 (with Eleanor A. Hunter), The Cosey Corner Stories
 (with Ella Beckwith Keeney) Dr. Grantley's Neighbors.

References 

  

Created via preloaddraft
1844 births
1932 deaths
American women writers
People from Albion, Orleans County, New York